Scoparia conicella is a species of moth in the family Crambidae. It is found in France, Belgium, Germany, Denmark, Sweden, Switzerland, Austria, Hungary and Italy.

The wingspan is 21–25 mm.

References

Moths described in 1863
Scorparia
Moths of Europe